The 2016 Scheldeprijs is a one-day semi-classic cycling race that took place in Belgium on 6 April 2016. It is rated as a 1.HC event as part of the 2016 UCI Europe Tour.

Unlike other spring classics such as Paris–Roubaix and the Tour of Flanders, the Scheldeprijs is suited particularly for the sprinters, such as the defending champion, Alexander Kristoff. Marcel Kittel and Mark Cavendish had both won the race three times. The finish was changed from previous years, with two extra corners added in the race finale in an attempt to improve safety. The route was flat throughout and finished with three laps of a circuit in Schoten.

The race was won by Kittel in a sprint finish, with Cavendish second and André Greipel third.

Teams 

There were 22 teams participating in the race. Of these, thirteen were UCI WorldTeams and nine were UCI Professional Continental teams.

Result

References

External links 

2016
Scheldeprijs
Scheldeprijs